The Mersey was a 1,829 ton iron-hulled sailing ship with a length of , beam of  and depth of . She was built by Charles Connell and Company of Glasgow, named after the River Mersey in north-western England and launched on 18 May 1894 for the Nourse Line. Nourse Line used her primarily to transport of Indian indentured labourers to the British colonies, a so called, Coolie ship. Details of some of these voyages are as follows:

In 1908 the Mersey was sold to the White Star Line for use as a training ship for 60 cadets, making six voyages to Australia as a White Star training ship, traveling around the Cape of Good Hope outbound and Cape Horn inbound. In 1910 she became the first sailing ship to be equipped with a radio. She was also the first sailing ship aboard which an operation for appendicitis was performed on a cadet. In 1915 the White Star Line gave up their training scheme due to the war and sold the Mersey to Norwegian owners. She changed hands a number of times and her name was changed to Transatlantic then to Dvergso. She was scrapped in 1923.

See also
 Olaf Engvig's book Legends in Sail (Chapter on Mersey) ISBN 978-0-578-11756-0: https://www.engvig.com/olaf/legendsinsail/index.shtml
 Mersey (1805 ship)
 Indian Indenture Ships to Fiji
 Indian indenture system

References

External links

Immigrant Ships Transcribers Guild: Suriname
Indian Immigrant Ship List
Encyclopedia Titanica Message Board topic "Mersey"

History of Suriname
Indian indentureship in Trinidad and Tobago
Indian indenture ships to Fiji
Victorian-era passenger ships of the United Kingdom
Individual sailing vessels
1894 ships